John Downs (2 March 1890 – 4 May 1975) was an Australian rules footballer who played with Fitzroy and Carlton in the Victorian Football League (VFL).

Notes

External links 
		
Johnny Downs's profile at Blueseum		
		
		

1890 births
1975 deaths
Australian rules footballers from Melbourne
Fitzroy Football Club players		
Carlton Football Club players
People from Collingwood, Victoria